Puberty Blues is a 1981 Australian coming-of-age comedy-drama film directed by Bruce Beresford, based on the 1979 novel of the same name (essentially a protofeminist teen novel) by Kathy Lette and Gabrielle Carey.

Plot 
The story focuses on two teenage girls from the middle-class Sutherland Shire in Sydney. The girls attempt to create a popular social status by ingratiating themselves with the "Greenhill gang" of surfers, a group of boys with a careless attitude toward casual sex, drugs and alcohol, over the course of one Sydney summer.

Cast 

 Nell Schofield as Debbie Vickers
 Jad Capelja as Sue Knight
 Jeffrey Rhoe as Garry
 Tony Hughes as Danny
 Sandy Paul as Tracy
 Leander Brett as Cheryl
 Rowena Wallace as Mrs. Knight
 Charles 'Bud' Tingwell as The Headmaster

Production 
Television writer Margaret Kelly was working at a writing workshop at a suburban theatre where she met Kathy Lette and Gabrielle Carey, who had written a number of unpublished stories about growing up in the surfing beaches of southern Sydney. Kelly showed the stories to producer and writer Joan Long, and optioned the film rights. Carey and Lette went on to write a column in The Sun-Herald as The Salami Sisters and the stories were published under the title Puberty Blues.

Long first approached Gillian Armstrong to direct but she turned it down. Then Bruce Beresford read the book and wrote asking to direct:
I bought it [the novel] while I was waiting for a bus in North Sydney. I went to get a chocolate or something and I saw a pile of these things sitting on the counter. I thought I'd buy one and read it on the bus going home. It was remarkable, a very well-expressed book. And the girls were only fifteen. It was a sort of insight into the way of life of those kids, which was a revelation to me... Kathy Lette was a real livewire and so was the other girl, Gabrielle Carey.
The movie was made with the assistance of the Australian Film Commission, who provided $413,708. The lead roles were cast after an extensive selection process.

Nell Schofield, said that "It's a very honest and realistic movie. It touches on this and it touches on that. I really like it. It's subtle and doesn't preach: 'This is the way of life.'" Schofield felt that "Different sections of the audience will perceive different levels. The parents who go and see it will come out and either believe it or it will give them a bit of a jolt. They'll start looking at their kids a different way and try to bridge the generation gap." She added that "The film is feminist in a way. I think it is also a comment on peer group pressure, male chauvinism in teenage groups, school and parent hassles."

Schofield found the surfing scenes easy because she was an avid surfer in real life. "Like Debbie, I wanted to be a surfie chick. But once I was, I wanted out before it got too heavy. I hated the alcohol and the drug scene. I saw so many kids fall down on the ground after taking drugs." Of making the film Schofield said "We didn't expect any glitter, and we didn't get any. It was hard work."

Changes from book to film 
For censorship reasons, in the film their age was increased to 16. Much of the content of the novel appears in the film, with several passages of text recounted by the film's protagonist, Debbie, in a voice-over narration. The film closely follows the story and character trajectory of the novel. Some of the novel's characters are composites in the film. The tone of the novel is generally darker than that of the film, and in the novel Debbie and Sue are shown to be much more willing participants in activities than they are in the film. Some of the darker moments of the book have been removed or softened for the film. The film adds a comedy beach brawl between the surfers and the lifeguards not present in the novel.

Lette complained that "the film sanitised the plot by omitting central references to miscarriage and abortion. The movie depicts a culture in which gang rape is incidental, mindless violence is amusing and hard drug use is fatal, but it was unable to address the consequences of the brutal sexual economy in which the girls must exist."

Much of the obscure surfer slang of the novel was omitted from the film. The novel features some discussion about television series Number 96. One passage of the novel that mentions the title is recounted by the film's protagonist in a voice-over narration, but because the series had ended by the time of the 1981 film the series title is replaced by the generic term "television".

Reception

Soundtrack
The theme song "Puberty Blues" was written by Tim Finn. In the film it was sung by Sharon O'Neill. It was released by Jenny Morris as a single on Mushroom Records in December 1981.

Box office
Puberty Blues grossed $3,918,000 at the box office in Australia.

Home media
Puberty Blues was first released on home video in the early 1980s. It made its debut on DVD with a new print by Umbrella Entertainment in 2003. The DVD is compatible with all region codes and includes special features such as the trailer, interviews with Nell Schofield and Bruce Beresford, trivia and biographies.

In 2013, Umbrella Entertainment released the film on Blu-ray.

Umbrella Entertainment has also released a three-disc DVD set with Monkey Grip and Dimboola.

See also
 Puberty Blues (TV series)

References

Further reading

External links
 
 Puberty Blues at Ozmovies
 Puberty Blues at the National Film and Sound Archive
 
 
 Puberty Blues at Bundeena Info

1981 films
1981 comedy-drama films
1980s coming-of-age comedy-drama films
1980s sports comedy-drama films
1980s teen comedy-drama films
Australian coming-of-age comedy-drama films
Australian sports comedy-drama films
Australian teen comedy-drama films
Films about puberty
Films based on Australian novels
Films directed by Bruce Beresford
Films set in Sydney
Films set on beaches
Films shot in Sydney
Australian surfing films
Teen sports films
1980s English-language films